Kate Wilmot is an Anglican bishop in Australia. She was consecrated in August 2015 to serve as an assistant bishop in the Anglican Diocese of Perth.

Wilmot was born in Darwin, Northern Territory and educated at  the University of Western Australia. She worked as a computer typesetter before her ordination. She was the incumbent at Bayswater, Western Australia, before her episcopal appointment.

References

External links

 

21st-century Anglican bishops in Australia
Living people
Assistant bishops in the Anglican Diocese of Perth
People from Darwin, Northern Territory
University of Western Australia alumni
Year of birth missing (living people)
Women Anglican bishops